UnHung Hero (also known as Unhung Hero) is a 2013 documentary directed by Brian Spitz and starring Patrick Moote.

Overview
Patrick Moote very publicly proposes to his girlfriend – while being shown on the jumbotron screen at a UCLA basketball game – and she refuses his proposal. A video clip of the failed proposal ends up on YouTube and gets millions of views. She later says that one reason for rejecting his proposal is because his penis is too small. Moote then travels the world to find out if size really matters.

References

External links

2013 films
American independent films
Documentary films about sexuality
Human penis
2010s English-language films
2010s American films